Hermann IV may refer to:

 Herman IV, Duke of Swabia (died 1038)
 Hermann IV, Margrave of Baden (1135–1190)
 Hermann IV of Hesse (1450–1508)
 Herman IV, Landgrave of Hesse-Rotenburg (1607–1658)